Adenophora liliifolia is a species of plants belonging to the family Campanulaceae.

It is native to Europe and Northern America.

Synonyms:
  Adenophora lilifolia (L.) Ledeb. ex A.DC.

References

Campanuloideae